Paradonus is a genus of click beetles in the family Elateridae. There are about six described species in Paradonus.

Species
These six species belong to the genus Paradonus:
 Paradonus beckeri Stibick, 1990 g b
 Paradonus futilis b
 Paradonus inops b
 Paradonus obliquatulus (Melsheimer, 1848) g b
 Paradonus olivereae Stibick, 1990 g b
 Paradonus pectoralis (Say, 1834) g b
Data sources: i = ITIS, c = Catalogue of Life, g = GBIF, b = Bugguide.net

References

Further reading

External links

 

Elateridae